Albert Norman Tamatoa Nikoro (born 7 August 1992) is a New Zealand-born Samoan rugby union player who last played as a wing for the Western Force in Super Rugby and for Perth Spirit in Australia's National Rugby Championship. He represents Manu Samoa internationally.

He previously played for the Auckland Blues in Super Rugby and for Mitre 10 Cup teams Auckland and the Tasman Makos in New Zealand.

Early years
Nikoro made the Mount Albert Grammar School 1st XV in 2007 in his just his second year in high school where he scored a try on his debut as a 14-year-old. That year the 1st XV won the Auckland Secondary Schools 1st XV competition and were runners up in the New Zealand Secondary Schools Top 4 competition. Nikoro also featured in the schools back to back Auckland Secondary Schools 1st XV championships in 2009 and also in 2010 where the school also won the New Zealand Secondary Schools Top 4 competition.

His family includes his dad, Stan, a police officer, his mother, a flight attendant and 2 sisters, Estee and Lausapai.

Super Rugby statistics

Notes

1992 births
Living people
New Zealand rugby union players
New Zealand sportspeople of Cook Island descent
Rugby union wings
Rugby union fullbacks
Blues (Super Rugby) players
Auckland rugby union players
Tasman rugby union players
Rugby union players from Auckland
People educated at Mount Albert Grammar School
Waikato rugby union players
Perth Spirit players
Western Force players